Guilty Guilty Guilty is a live performance album by avant-garde musician Diamanda Galás, released on 1 April 2008 by Mute Records.

Track listing

Personnel
Diamanda Galás – vocals, arrangement, production, art direction
Production and additional personnel
Blaise Dupuy – recording, mixing
Joe LaPorta – mastering
Emily Lazar – mastering
P.A. Taylor – design
Austin Young – photography

Release history

References

External links 
 

Diamanda Galás albums
2008 live albums
Mute Records live albums